Marion Wohlrab (born 8 June 1974) is a German speed skater. She competed in three events at the 2002 Winter Olympics.

References

External links
 

1974 births
Living people
German female speed skaters
Olympic speed skaters of Germany
Speed skaters at the 2002 Winter Olympics
Sportspeople from Upper Bavaria
People from Pfaffenhofen (district)